Corey Yasuto Gaines (born June 1, 1965) is an American professional basketball coach and former player. He played five seasons in the NBA, and was a four-time Israeli Premier League Assists Leader, in 1999 and in 2001 to 2003. He was also a former head coach of the Phoenix Mercury of the Women's National Basketball Association (WNBA).

Professional career
Gaines was selected by the Seattle SuperSonics in the 3rd round (65th overall) of the 1988 NBA Draft. A 6' 3" (1.90 m) guard from UCLA and Loyola Marymount University, Gaines played in 5 NBA seasons for 4 different teams. He played for the New Jersey Nets (1988–89), Philadelphia 76ers (1989–90, 1994–95), Denver Nuggets (1990–91) and New York Knicks (1993–94). In his NBA career, he played in 80 games and scored a total of 248 points. Throughout his NBA career, he also spent time playing in Continental Basketball Association for multiple teams.

Gaines also played in multiple international basketball leagues (including the Japanese professional men's basketball league) throughout the late 1990s and early 2000s. He was a four-time Israeli Premier League Assists Leader, in 1999 and in 2001 to 2003. The last team he played for was the Long Beach Jam under the revived American Basketball Association. The Jam won the ABA Championship in their first season of existence, thanks in part to having players like Dennis Rodman on their squad.

Coaching career
After winning the ABA Championship, Gaines would retire from playing basketball and start out as an assistant coach for the Long Beach Jam in their second year of existence. During the season, he would take over the head coach role there after their previous coach would accept a coaching role in the NBA. After the Jam's second season ended, it was announced that the Long Beach Jam would not play the next season due to their eventual move to Bakersfield in order to complete their transition to the NBA Development League. As a result, he would soon be an assistant coach for the Phoenix Mercury for the 2006 and 2007 seasons. On November 7, 2007, Gaines became the head coach of the Phoenix Mercury, replacing outgoing head coach Paul Westhead. Gaines had prior experience with Westhead's offense, having played for him at Loyola Marymount University and with the Nuggets. Gaines kept the same offense that Westhead employed, and in 2009, he directed the Mercury to their second WNBA title. Under Gaines' guidance, Diana Taurasi became the second player in WNBA history to win the regular season scoring title, the WNBA MVP Award, the WNBA Championship, and the WNBA Finals MVP Award in the same season.

In November 2011, Gaines was promoted to general manager of the Mercury, taking over a position vacated by Ann Meyers-Drysdale. On August 8, 2013, the Phoenix Mercury announced that they had relieved Gaines of his duties as head coach and general manager, and named former University of Arizona and Grand Canyon University men's basketball head coach Russ Pennell as the team's interim head coach.

Gaines would have his first coaching experience in the NBA with the Phoenix Suns as a player development coach, starting back in the 2010–11 season. In January 2013, Gaines was temporarily promoted to being an assistant head coach for the Phoenix Suns alongside Dan Panaggio after both Dan Majerle and Elston Turner would resign from their roles after the announcement of Lindsey Hunter being the team's interim head coach. He would then continue working under the organization throughout the rest of the 2012-13 NBA season until the Suns hired permanent replacement assistant head coaches to replace their old coaching staff, although Gaines would still work for the organization as a player development coach alongside Irving Roland during the 2013–14 and 2014–15 seasons. However, on July 30, 2015, Gaines would end up being promoted back as a full-time assistant coach for the Suns for the 2015-16 NBA season due to some changes with the coaching and player development staffs respectively. Gaines would also be considered a prime candidate for the interim coach tag for the Suns after head coach Jeff Hornacek was fired on February 1, 2016. However, after a generally awful season that was even worse than their 2012–13 season, Gaines would not have his contract renewed with the team.

Before the start of the 2016–17 season, Gaines would reunite with head coach Jeff Hornacek and assistant coach Jerry Sichting as an assistant coach for the New York Knicks. Prior to the start of the 2018–19 season, the Detroit Pistons hired Gaines as a Coaching Consultant. Before the start of the 2019–20 season, Gaines was hired as an assistant coach with the Washington Wizards.

Personal life
Gaines' father is African-American and his mother is of Japanese descent.

Notes

External links

1965 births
Living people
African-American basketball coaches
African-American basketball players
American expatriate basketball people in Canada
American expatriate basketball people in Israel
American expatriate basketball people in Italy
American expatriate basketball people in Japan
American expatriate basketball people in Turkey
American men's basketball coaches
American men's basketball players
American sportspeople of Japanese descent
American women's basketball coaches
Basketball coaches from California
Basketball players from Los Angeles
Denver Nuggets players
Galatasaray S.K. (men's basketball) players
Hapoel Eilat basketball players
Long Beach Jam players
Loyola Marymount Lions men's basketball players
Maccabi Haifa B.C. players
Maccabi Rishon LeZion basketball players
McDonald's High School All-Americans
New Jersey Nets players
New York Knicks players
New York Knicks assistant coaches
Omaha Racers players
Parade High School All-Americans (boys' basketball)
Philadelphia 76ers players
Phoenix Mercury coaches
Phoenix Suns assistant coaches
Point guards
Quad City Thunder players
Scaligera Basket Verona players
Seattle SuperSonics draft picks
Sioux Falls Skyforce (CBA) players
UCLA Bruins men's basketball players
Victoria Libertas Pallacanestro players
Washington Wizards assistant coaches
Women's National Basketball Association championship-winning head coaches
Women's National Basketball Association general managers
Yakima Sun Kings players
21st-century African-American people
20th-century African-American sportspeople